The 2003 St. Petersburg Open was a tennis tournament played on indoor hard courts at the Petersburg Sports and Concert Complex in Saint Petersburg in Russia and was part of the International Series of the 2003 ATP Tour. The tournament ran from October 20 through October 26, 2003.

Finals

Men's singles

 Gustavo Kuerten defeated  Sargis Sargsian 6–4, 6–3
 It was Kuerten's 2nd title of the year and the 27th of his career.

Men's doubles

 Julian Knowle /  Nenad Zimonjić defeated  Michael Kohlmann /  Rainer Schüttler 7–6(7–1), 6–3
 It was Knowle's 2nd title of the year and the 4th of his career. It was Zimonjić's 2nd title of the year and the 7th of his career.

External links
 Official website  
 Official website 
 ATP Tournament Profile

St. Petersburg Open
St. Petersburg Open
St. Petersburg Open
St. Petersburg Open